Process Oriented Guided Inquiry Learning (POGIL)is an activity-based, group-learning instructional strategy. The main objective of POGIL is to help the students to master the discipline, content, and develop essential learning skills simultaneously. 

POGIL was created in 1994 to improve teaching of general chemistry. Today, POGIL is implemented in a wide range of subjects in more than 1,000 American high schools and colleges.

Activities 

There are two crucial aspects to the design of a POGIL activity. First, sufficient appropriate information must be provided for the initial exploration so that students are able to develop the desired concepts. Second, the guiding questions must be sequenced in constructed manner so that students reach the appropriate conclusion, develop various process and learn skills. 

Typically, the first few questions build on students' prior knowledge and direct attention to the information provided by the model. This is followed by questions designed to help promote the recognitions of relationships and patterns in the data, leading toward some concept development. The final questions may involve applying the concepts to new situations and generalizing students' new knowledge and understanding. Thus, POGIL activities follow the structure of the learning cycle of exploration, concept invention, and application. POGIL instruction has a strong basis in constructivism.

Classroom implementation 

Students in a POGIL classroom may work in small groups of three or four to tackle a specifically designed activity. Each student is assigned a role, such as a task manager, recorder, spokesperson, or reflector. The instructor acts as a facilitator. In their groups, students may discuss and analyze problems and their answers to questions that are crafted to help lead them to consider the general ideas in question and to construct their own understanding of important concepts. As they formulate their ideas, they may share their understanding and discoveries with other groups.

Rather than having the instructor begin class by defining terms and laying out concepts, students work actively to master material and formulate a deeper understanding of content. Built into the experience is the support of a variety of important process skills, including communication, teamwork, and critical thinking, which translates to a more complete understanding of the entire concept, and a lasting understanding of the material.

The POGIL Project 

The teaching method of POGIL is supported by the POGIL Project, a non-profit 501(c)3 organization based in Lancaster, PA. The POGIL Project has earned numerous grants from the National Science Foundation and other sources. The POGIL Project is based on an understanding of the important components of an effective faculty development structure. The project trains faculty to implement POGIL in their classrooms and creates new POGIL materials through a multitude of opportunities including workshops, on-site visits, and consultancies. The project also hosts an annual POGIL National Meeting to grow and expand the POGIL community. 

The current director of The POGIL Project is Rick Moog, a Professor of Chemistry at Franklin & Marshall College. Dr. Moog has used POGIL materials in his teaching since 1994 and is a co-author of POGIL materials for both general and physical chemistry.

References

External links 
 The POGIL Project

Pedagogy